Hall Lake or Lake Hall may refer to:

 two Hall Lakes in Arkansas County, Arkansas
 Hall Lake in Crawford County, Arkansas
 Hall Lake in Cross County, Arkansas
 Lake Hall, a lake in Florida
 Hall Lake (Clearwater County, Minnesota)
 Hall Lake (Martin County, Minnesota)